Swedish singer Zara Larsson is the recipient of numerous awards including three MTV European Music Awards and eight Rockbjörnen. Additionally, Larsson has received four Grammis out of eleven nominations, which are considered as the Swedish equivalent of the Grammy Awards.

Awards and nominations

Notes

References

External links
 List of awards and nominations at the Internet Movie Database

Lists of awards received by Swedish musician
Awards